The three-coloured harlequin toad (Atelopus tricolor)  is a species of toad in the family Bufonidae.
It is found in Bolivia and Peru.
Its natural habitats are subtropical or tropical moist montane forests and rivers.
It is threatened by habitat loss.

Characteristics 
They have slim body; head is longer than broad; snout acuminate; nostril lateral not visible from above; eye width is about the same length as distance from nostril to anterior corner of eye. Loreal area barely convex; upper lip fleshy; immediate lateral postorbital are convex; temporal area slightly convex; tympanum absent; dorsal postorbital crest developed but not prominent. Tibia long; foot shorter than tibia; relative length of toes: 1<2<3<5<4; metatarsal tubercles poorly developed.

References

Sources
 

Atelopus
Amphibians described in 1902
Taxonomy articles created by Polbot